Nathan Scott is a fictional character on One Tree Hill.

Nathan Scott may also refer to:

Nathan Scott (composer) (1915–2010), film and television composer
Nathan A. Scott Jr. (1925–2006), literary scholar
Nathan B. Scott (1842–1924), U.S. politician